Laurier Avenue (officially in ) is a commercial and residential street in Montreal, Quebec, Canada. It crosses the boroughs of Outremont, Le Plateau-Mont-Royal and Rosemont–La Petite-Patrie. It is known for its cafés, restaurants and specialty stores, especially near Park Avenue and east of Sir Wilfrid Laurier Park.

The largest concentration of shops on Laurier Avenue are located between Clark Street and Querbes Avenue. These are mainly upscale decorating and children's clothing stores, as well as restaurants and cafes.

Laurier Station, on the Montreal Metro's Orange Line, is located at the intersection of Laurier Avenue and Berri Street.

History
Laurier Avenue was originally known as St. Louis Street, in the old village of Mile End. After the annexation of that village to the City of Montreal in 1899, it was decided that the street name should be changed to Laurier Avenue in honour of the former Prime Minister of Canada, Sir Wilfrid Laurier.

Further reading
Ville de Montréal. Les rues de Montréal. Répertoire historique. Montréal. Méridien, 1995.

External links
 Articles on Laurier Avenue - City of Montreal website 

Streets in Montreal